Matthew Busche (born May 9, 1985) is an American former professional road racing cyclist, who rode professionally between 2009 and 2016 for the , ,  and  teams. In 2009, he gained notoriety for his rapid rise from a Wisconsin-based amateur team to  within the course of one season. Busche was the winner of the 2011 and 2015 United States National Road Race Championships.

Biography 
Busche, son of Craig and Cindy Busche, grew up in Wauwatosa, Wisconsin and is a graduate of Luther College in Decorah, Iowa. He got his start in endurance sports as a runner, and first took up cycling in 2005 as a form of cross-training during a running injury. He was a two-time NCAA All-American cross country athlete, and the 2007 Iowa Conference MVP. Completing his college running career in 2007, Busche switched his focus to cycling and joined the ISCorp amateur cycling team. During his second season of racing in 2009, Busche rode as a stagiaire for Pro-Continental team Kelly Benefits Strategies, and was later offered a contract with UCI ProTour team, .

On December 15, 2016, Busche announced his retirement from professional cycling.

Personal life
Busche currently lives in Brevard, North Carolina with his wife, Lisa.

Major results

2009
 5th Road race, National Road Championships
 7th Overall Tour of Utah
 9th Overall Univest Grand Prix
2010
 3rd Overall Danmark Rundt
 5th Time trial, National Road Championships
2011
 National Road Championships
1st  Road race
3rd Time trial
2012
 2nd Overall Tour of Utah
 8th Overall USA Pro Cycling Challenge
2013
 4th Gran Premio Città di Camaiore
 5th Overall Tour of Utah
 6th Overall Tour of California
 7th Overall Tour of Austria
2014
 5th Overall USA Pro Cycling Challenge
2015
 1st  Road race, National Road Championships
 1st Stage 1 (TTT) Tour of Alberta
2016
 7th Overall Tour of the Gila
 8th The Reading 120
 9th Winston-Salem Cycling Classic

References

External links 

1985 births
Living people
American male cyclists
People from Wauwatosa, Wisconsin
Cyclists from Wisconsin
Luther College (Iowa) alumni